Dampe may refer to:

 Jacob Jacobsen Dampe, Danish theologian
 Dampé, a character in The Legend of Zelda series
 Dark Matter Particle Explorer, a Chinese space observatory that uses the acronym DAMPE